Raymond Fonvieille (born 16 October 1942) is a French speed skater. He competed in two events at the 1964 Winter Olympics.

References

1942 births
Living people
French male speed skaters
Olympic speed skaters of France
Speed skaters at the 1964 Winter Olympics
Sportspeople from Paris